Leroy Colbert (born May 9, 1933 NY, USA - died November 20, 2015 age 82) was an American bodybuilder. He is notable as being credited as the first man to develop 21" circumference arms. He was a traditionalist using full body workouts with a mini push/pull, where you a pushing exercises following by a pulling exercise. This also applied to legs don't do a quadricep exercise followed by another quadricep exercise. Leroy said you are not giving the muscle enough rest when you train it back to back. He and along with his friends such as Marvin Eder in their youth pioneered many of the principles bodybuilders today use. An example of these principles were the 21 curls where you do 7 curls to perpendicular, 7 curls perpidicular to chest and 7 full curls. Another example of Leroy's principle was the priority principle, where the muscle you train first will grow biggest because you put the most energy in the beginning of the workout. It was also to be paired with the saturation principle where the first exercise you do the most sets to saturate it with blood. Lastly, Leroy and his friends also pioneered the tri and quadra sets in a Bicep,Tricep,Bicep....etc. style. His other training principles can be found on his channel.

Colbert famously was wary of the worth of using steroids and never used the substance in an era where steroids had just started coming into bodybuilding. His views on steroids were formed in his later years as he was unaware of their effects in his youth and admits he would have used them had he not had his accident, stopping his competitive career. He started training age 10. In 2003 he was inducted into The IFBB Hall of Fame. He was the first black man on the cover of Muscle Power magazine.

Colbert won only a few titles (Mr. New York City and Mr America East) but was famous for being on many covers of Weider magazines with his huge upper body development. His competitive career ended after a horrific motorbike accident nearly severing his foot. Motorbikes were his long life passion and this didn't stop him riding. After the accident he used his experience working in Weider's shipping warehouse to open a supplement store where he made a wealthy amount for himself. He was married three times.

Colbert used a website and YouTube videos on Yorkieloverfitness in later life to export his extensive knowledge and over 60 years of experience to others and to protect people from the lies of the fitness and supplement industry.

Arms: 21.25"

Chest: 52"

Waist: 32"

Thighs: 28"

Weight: 205lbs

All the measurements are from Muscle Power magazine (November 1953) before his accident, apart from arms which he developed to 21.25" after his accident (once his competitive career ended)

Competition history 
1951

Mr Eastern America - AAU, 6th

1952

Mr America - AAU, 17th

Mr New York City - AAU,  Winner

Mr New York State - AAU, 5th

1953

Mr Eastern America - AAU,  Winner

Mr New York State - AAU, 5th

1954

Junior Mr America - AAU, East , Did not place

References 

 http://www.musclememory.com/show.php?a=Colbert,+Leroy
 http://www.ifbbpro.com/leroy-colbert/
https://www.youtube.com/watch?v=DnNpfCqhfTM

https://www.youtube.com/watch?v=mM_dob-uvqg
https://www.youtube.com/watch?v=755NTpZaN4E

1933 births
2015 deaths
American bodybuilders
People associated with physical culture